The Colour in Anything is the third studio album by English singer-songwriter and producer James Blake. It was released on 6 May 2016, by Polydor Records. It serves as the follow-up to his Mercury Prize-winning 2013 album Overgrown. It features contributions from Justin Vernon and Frank Ocean, and additional production work by Rick Rubin.

Background and recording
In November 2014, Blake announced that his third album was "seventy percent done" and would be released in "about five months." In January 2015, he announced the album title Radio Silence. He later stated that the album would feature Justin Vernon (of Bon Iver) and Kanye West, as well as guitar work from Connan Mockasin. In a May 2016 interview with BBC Radio 1, Blake stated that he began work on the album in his bedroom studio in South London, and after "running out of steam" went to United States to complete the recording at Shangri La Studios with producer Rick Rubin.

Recording involved writing contributions from Justin Vernon and singer Frank Ocean, the latter described by Blake as "a huge inspiration for this record." Regarding Kanye West's absence from the project, Blake clarified that "I wanted Kanye to be on the song "Timeless," but the verse didn’t materialize. I think a huge swath of things happened in his life, and I just stayed out of it." During this period, Blake also worked with singer Beyoncé on her 2016 album Lemonade, contributing to two tracks.

Blake reportedly "explored sitting at the piano and singing a lot more" during the album's conception, and developed a desire "to work with other people on my own projects" in an attempt to relinquish some control over his own work. Discussing the tone of the album in contrast to his previous work, he stated that "I realized that [when it comes to making music], it wasn't important whether I was happy or sad—it's about sensitivity and your reaction to the world. I wouldn't want to be one of those artists that keeps themselves in a perpetual cycle of anxiety and depression just to extract music from that."

Promotion and release
On February 11, 2016, Blake premiered a new song entitled "Modern Soul" during his BBC Radio 1 residency. On April 14, 2016, he premiered a new song titled "Timeless," and announced the completion of an album featuring 18 tracks.

On April 28, social media posts by Blake and his label, 1-800 Dinosaur, reposted photos of a mural by children's novel illustrator Sir Quentin Blake (best known for his work with writer Roald Dahl; the two are not related) that hinted at the new album title The Colour in Anything; these were confirmed as the new title and artwork of his album several days later. The murals were displayed in London and Brooklyn. On May 5, Blake unexpectedly announced that the album would be released at midnight.

Critical reception

Upon its release, The Colour in Anything received generally favourable reviews from critics. At Metacritic, which assigns a rating out of 100 to reviews from mainstream critics, the album received an average score of 78, based on 28 reviews, which indicates "generally favorable" reception. In a review for Pitchfork, Kevin Lozano wrote that Blake's music is "unparalleled, spacious, and impossibly textured." He goes on to write that "At the end of the day Blake just wants to prioritize happiness and self-knowledge above all else. It’s a thoroughly unhip statement that makes you believe smiling, even if it hurts, is the coolest possible thing in the world you can do." The Guardian wrote that "The Colour in Anything reaffirms that he stands apart from his new peers. His music is not nice; the production frequently evokes a disturbed mind, and over it he speaks of profound alienation."

In a lukewarm review for The New York Times, Ben Ratliff opined that the album "grows self-pitying, almost maudlin, in ways Blake has managed to avoid in the past simply by using more elusive lyrical metaphors." Resident Advisor noted that the production was "a notch above" Blake's previous work, making special mention of the tracks "Points" and "Modern Soul," but notes that the album grows "tiresome" through its midsection, and likens it to a "funeral procession." Some critics criticized the album's length, pointing to some tracks that could be cut for time. PopMatters compared Blake to rapper Drake, stating that "like Drake, he had it in him to release a great album here. He just chose not to," while describing much of the album as "colorless and tedious, with Blake’s typical lugubriousness added in."

British mastering engineer Ian Shepherd praised the album's sound, declaring that "It has depth, it has weight, it has space [...] That’s the dynamics, doing what they’re meant to do, in music – giving you goosebumps. Of course it’s a superb vocal performance too, that goes without saying – but trust me, it wouldn’t have anything like the impact if it was crushed and distorted the way so many recent releases are. And unlike those releases, where I inevitably turn them down lower and lower over time, exhausted by the constant maxed-out wall-of-sound, listening to this album loud feels great – and I want to keep listening."

Accolades

Track listing
All tracks written and produced by James Blake, except where noted.

Notes
  signifies an additional producer
  signifies an executive producer

Sample credits
 "Radio Silence" contains an interpolation of "Hope She'll Be Happier" by Bill Withers.
 "Love Me in Whatever Way" features samples from "Giving Up" by Donny Hathaway.
 "Choose Me" features samples from "More" by Tamia.
 "Always" contains an interpolation of "Godspeed" by Frank Ocean.

Personnel 

 James Blake – writing (all tracks), production (all tracks), mixing (all tracks)
 Frank Ocean – writing (track 9)
 Justin Vernon – writing (tracks 11, 17), production (track 17), additional production (track 14)
 Rick Rubin – production (tracks 2, 3, 12, 15), executive production (tracks 9, 11, 14)
 Matt Mysko – engineer (track 5), recording engineer
 David Kim – engineer (track 13), recording engineer
 B.J. Burton – engineer (track 17)
 Jason Lader – modular synth (track 2), recording engineer
 Connan Mockasin – bass guitar (track 12)
 Chris Messina – vocoder effect (track 17)
 Matt Colton – mastering (all tracks)
 Dan Foat – mangagement, A&R
 Josh Smith – recording engineer, mix assistance
 Sean Oakley – recording engineer
 Nathan Boddy – mix assistance
 Burgess Studio – design, art direction
 Sir Quentin Blake – illustration

Charts

Weekly charts

Year-end charts

References

2016 albums
Albums produced by James Blake (musician)
Albums produced by Rick Rubin
Albums recorded at Shangri-La (recording studio)
James Blake (musician) albums
Polydor Records albums
Republic Records albums